Guillermo Pérez Roldán was the defending champion.

Pérez-Roldán successfully defended his title, defeating Jonas Svensson, 7–5, 6–3 in the final.

Seeds

  Anders Järryd (quarterfinals)
  Emilio Sánchez (semifinals)
  Joakim Nyström (second round)
  Andrei Chesnokov (quarterfinals)
  Jonas Svensson (final)
  Guillermo Pérez Roldán (champion)
  Jakob Hlasek (third round)
  Eduardo Bengoechea (second round)
  Carl-Uwe Steeb (quarterfinals)
  Ronald Agénor (third round)
  Jordi Arrese (third round)
  Jim Pugh (second round)
  Tore Meinecke (quarterfinals)
  Darren Cahill (second round)
  Jérôme Potier (second round)
  Alberto Mancini (third round)

Draw

Finals

Top half

Section 1

Section 2

Bottom half

Section 3

Section 4

External links
 Main draw

1988 BMW Open